Robert McKee (born January 30, 1941) is an author, lecturer and story consultant who is known for his "Story Seminar", which he developed when he was a professor at the University of Southern California. McKee is the author of Story: Substance, Structure, Style and the Principles of Screenwriting, Dialogue: the Art of Verbal Action for Stage, Page and Screen, Storynomics: Story-Driven Marketing in the Post-Advertising World and Character: The Art of Role and Cast Design for Page, Stage, and Screen. McKee also has the blog and online writers' resource "Storylogue".

Robert McKee's "Story Seminars" have been held around the globe including Boston, Moscow, Amsterdam, Beijing, Mumbai, Paris, Rio de Janeiro, Sydney and annually in New York City, Los Angeles, and London. The three-day seminar teaches writers the principles of storytelling. McKee's one-day "Genre Seminars" teach writers the conventions of different styles of storytelling including thriller, comedy, horror, love story, action story, and writing for television.

Rather than teaching story as a "mechanical" form, McKee gained attention for teaching story principles, allowing writers for theater, novels, film and television freedom to apply them as they wish provided the story ultimately "works."

After consulting on business storytelling for multinational companies including Microsoft, Nike, Hewlett-Packard, Time Warner, and Siemens, in 2013 McKee launched a seminar for the business community in Los Angeles, New York City, Beijing, and Malta. In 2018, McKee partnered with digital marketer and Skyword CEO Tom Gerace to write Storynomics: Story-Driven Marketing in the Post-Advertising World. Storynomics, and the accompanying seminar, instructs leaders, managers and marketers how to use story in strategic management, brand management, and business communications.

Early life in the theater 
Robert McKee began his theater career at the age of nine, playing the title role in a community theater production of Martin the Shoemaker. He continued acting as a teenager in theater productions in his hometown of Detroit, Michigan. Upon receiving the Evans Scholarship, he attended the University of Michigan and earned a bachelor's degree in English Literature. While an undergraduate, he acted in and directed over thirty productions. McKee's creative writing professor was the noted Kenneth Thorpe Rowe.

After completing his Bachelor of Arts degree, McKee toured with the APA (Association of Producing Artists) Repertory Company, appearing on Broadway alongside Helen Hayes, Rosemary Harris and Will Geer. He then received the Professional Theater Fellowship and returned to Ann Arbor, Michigan to earn his Master's degree in Theater Arts.

Upon graduating, McKee directed the Toledo Repertory Company, acted with the American Drama Festival, and became artistic director of the Aaron Deroy Theater. From there he traveled to London to accept the position of artist-in-residence at the National Theatre Company where he studied Shakespearean production at the Old Vic theatre. He then returned to New York City and spent the next seven years as an actor/director.

Mid-life in the film industry 
After deciding to move his career to film, McKee attended Cinema School at the University of Michigan. While there, he directed two short films: A Day Off, which he also wrote, and Talk To Me Like The Rain, adapted from a one-act play by Tennessee Williams. These two films won the Cine Eagle Award, awards at the Brussels and Grenoble Film Festivals, and prizes at the Delta, Rochester, Chicago and Baltimore Film Festivals.

In 1979, McKee moved to Los Angeles, where he began to write screenplays and work as a story analyst for United Artists and NBC. He sold his first screenplay Dead Files to AVCO/Embassy Films, after which he joined the WGA (Writers Guild of America). His next screenplay, Hard Knocks, won the National Screenwriting Contest, and since then McKee has had eight feature film screenplays purchased or optioned, including the feature film script Trophy for Warner Bros. (Only one of these films, however, was produced). In addition to his screenplays, McKee has had a number of scripts produced for television series such as Quincy, M.E. (starring Jack Klugman), Mrs. Columbo (starring Kate Mulgrew), Spenser: for Hire and Kojak (starring Telly Savalas). McKee was also an early instructor at the pioneering Los Angeles film school the Sherwood Oaks Experimental College.

Starting the STORY seminar 
In 1983, as Fulbright Scholar, McKee joined the faculty of the School of Cinema-Television at the University of Southern California (USC), where he began offering his STORY Seminar class. A year later, McKee opened the course to the public, giving a three-day, 30-hour intensive class to sold-out audiences around the world.

Since 1984, more than 50,000 students have taken McKee's course in cities around the world: Los Angeles, New York, London, Paris, Sydney, Toronto, Boston, Las Vegas, San Francisco, Helsinki, Oslo, Munich, Tel Aviv, Auckland, Singapore, Barcelona, Stockholm, São Paulo and more. In March 2011 and again in 2012, he taught a four-day seminar in Bogotá, Colombia. In February 2012, he taught another four-day seminar in the Ramoji film city of Hyderabad in India. He did the same in Amsterdam, March 2014.

McKee's current lecture series includes the three-day "Story Seminar", one-day "Genre Seminars" (teaching the conventions of love story, thriller, comedy, horror, action and writing for television) and the one-day "Storynomics Seminar", teaching the application of storytelling principles in the business and marketing world (co-lectured with CEO of Skyword Tom Gerace).

McKee continues to be a project consultant to major film and television production companies, corporations and governments around the world, as well major software firms such as Microsoft. In addition, several companies such as ABC, Disney, Miramax, PBS, Nickelodeon and Paramount regularly send their creative and writing staffs to his lectures.

Life and awards 
Robert McKee is among the most widely known screenwriting lecturers. McKee's former students include over 65 Academy Award winners, 200 Emmy Award winners, 100 WGA (Writers Guild of America) Award winners and 50 DGA (Directors Guild of America) Award winners (all participated in McKee's course before or after winning their award; not all were awarded for writing), the British Book of the Year Award and the Pulitzer Prize for Feature Writing. Some recent notable former students to win or be nominated for Oscars include Akiva Goldsman for his screenplay "A Beautiful Mind," Peter Jackson (writer/director of "Lord of the Rings I, II and III"), Andrew Stanton ("WALL-E," “Finding Nemo") and Paul Haggis ("Million Dollar Baby," “Quantum of Solace"). 

Notable writers and actors such as Geoffrey Rush, Paul Haggis, Akiva Goldsman, William Goldman, Joan Rivers, David Bowie, Kirk Douglas, John Cleese, Tony Kaye, Steven Pressfield, among many others have taken his seminar.

In 1990, Robert McKee was brought to New Zealand by the NZ Film Commission, and delivered a three-day seminar on screenplay and story structure in Auckland and Wellington. In the audience were Jane Campion and Peter Jackson, the latter of which went on to write and direct Heavenly Creatures, The Lord of the Rings, and King Kong.

In 2000, McKee won the 1999 International Moving Image Book Award for his book Story (Regan Books/HarperCollins). The book has become required reading for film and cinema schools at Harvard, Yale, UCLA, USC and Tulane universities.[2] [3] The book was on the Los Angeles Times best-seller list for 20 weeks. It is translated into more than 20 languages.

In 2017, McKee was inducted into the Hall of Fame at the Final Draft Awards, an honor that recognizes professionals who have had a "profound influence on the industry" joining peers such as Lawrence Kasdan and Steven Zaillian.

McKee's other credits include writing and presenting the BBC series Filmworks, the Channel 4 series Reel Secrets, the BAFTA Award-winning J'accuse Citizen Kane television program which he wrote and presented, and the writing of Abraham, the four-hour mini-series on Turner Network Television (TNT) that starred Richard Harris, Barbara Hershey and Maximilian Schell.

Criticism
McKee has been criticized by writer Joe Eszterhas, for teaching screenwriting without ever having a script of his made into a film. (However, McKee is credited as writer of the 1994 TV movie Abraham.) McKee has responded to such criticisms, saying: "The world is full of people who teach things they themselves cannot do", while admitting that even though he sold all of his written screenplays, he still lacks their screen credit since they were only optioned and not ever produced by the studios.

Many of the ideas he discusses have been around since Aristotle and appear in the work of William Archer. Nevertheless, McKee himself tells his students that Aristotle is the basis for much of what he teaches, credits much of his writing on conflict and drama to the teaching of Kenneth Thorpe Rowe, and he often distributes some of John Howard Lawson's writings at his seminar: he acknowledges his forebears and never claims that he is inventing a brand new approach to storytelling. Furthermore, he claims that much of what he teaches was common knowledge 50 or 60 years ago, but that screenwriters have lost touch with the fundamentals of storytelling. In a CBC interview he said that to give his lecture in the 1930s, '40s or '50s "would have been ludicrous". McKee also appears and is criticized in several works, for example, Missionnaire by French author Joann Sfar.

In popular culture
In the Charlie Kaufman-penned film Adaptation., McKee's character was portrayed by the Emmy Award-winning actor Brian Cox. In the Oscar-winning movie, the desperate screenwriter Charlie Kaufman (played by Nicolas Cage) reluctantly goes to McKee's course, but then – after being "shaken" by McKee's tough-style response to his claim that "nothing happens in the real world" – Kaufman asks McKee to meet in person to discuss his failure to write the film adaptation he is working on.

Though the story depicts McKee as little more than an amalgam of hack clichés on the subject of screen writing, Charlie's slacker brother Donald (also played by Cage) uses the knowledge obtained attending the seminar to write a spec script he then sells for a large amount of money through his brother's agent. The film then concludes with the very ending which McKee had ridiculed (Deus ex machina), as well as a voice-over epilogue in which – by means of voice-over narration – Cage's Kaufman character admonishes himself for disobeying a cardinal rule of McKee's to avoid voice-over narration.

McKee appeared on the Simpsons episode "Caper Chase" as himself.

Anecdotes 
 McKee claims in his seminars that he does not say not to use voice-over narration. There is some truth to the scene in Adaptation however, as he vehemently teaches that using voice-over to substitute for telling the story via action and dialogue is weak, whereas he teaches that voice-over used to counterpoint and enrich the story can be wonderful. 
 McKee is known to object to the French-originated "auteur theory", which states that the director is the de facto author of a movie.  McKee states otherwise, that the writer/screenwriter is in fact the most important creator of the movie.
 In a Haaretz article, McKee was quoted as saying in front of a Tel Aviv audience that Israelis have a rough sense of humor, completely different from the known worldwide Jewish one, since Israelis are living in a harsh reality which leads them to lose their sense of humor.

Books
 Story: Substance, Structure, Style and the Principles of Screenwriting (1997)
 Dialogue: the Art of Verbal Action for Stage, Page and Screen (2016)
 Storynomics: Story-Driven Marketing in the Post-Advertising World (2018) with Thomas Gerace
 Character: The Art of Role and Cast Design for Page, Stage, and Screen (2021)
 Action: The Art of Excitement for Screen, Page, and Game (2022) with Bassem El-Wakil

References

External links 
 Robert McKee's Story Seminar — Official Web site
 
 Interview with Robert McKee by The New Yorker
 Advice for the aspiring CNN
 A writing guru's very own 'Story' CNN
 McKee's visit to Israel — Video article by Ynet News — in this words association-style interview, McKee relates to the following terms in the following order (in the video, the words are composed in Hebrew letter cubes): 1) Blank page, 2) Art of storytelling, 3) Inspiration, 4) Disappointment, 5) Thrill, 6) Mind control, 7) America, 8) Time.
 Screenwriting Guru — by Brett Forest
 Alice Cinema — French article
 BBC World Service — How to Write (interactive guide)
 http://www.writersinstitute.eu/business-story-seminar [TRUE TALK: STORY-in-BUSINESS Seminar – Malta]
 A short summary on the Screenwriters Federation Website
 What people are saying about the McKee course — an open forum
 http://www.magallanica.com Robert Mckee in Latin America 2009–2011 (Mario Velasco and Patricio Lynch).
 http://www.writersinstitute.eu [International Writers Institute under the patronage of Robert McKee]

1941 births
Living people
Writers from Detroit
University of Michigan College of Literature, Science, and the Arts alumni
USC School of Cinematic Arts faculty
20th-century American dramatists and playwrights
Film theorists
Screenwriting instructors
Writers of books about writing fiction
Fulbright alumni